Steven Jesse Maronic (May 13, 1917 – May 7, 1980) was an American football player. He played college football at the University of North Carolina at Chapel Hill and professionally for two season in the National Football League (NFL) with the Detroit Lions.

Maronic played as a tackle and placekicker for the North Carolina Tar Heels. In 1938, he earned All-American and All-Southern Conference honors while helping the Tar Heels to a 6–2–1 record. He played almost 60 minutes of every game in the 1938 season. Two of his strongest performances came in front of the New York media, against NYU at Yankee Stadium and Fordham at the Polo Grounds, solidifying his All-American candidacy. Maronic was successful on 13 straight points after touchdown that season.

References

External links
 

1917 births
1980 deaths
American football tackles
Detroit Lions players
North Carolina Tar Heels football players
Players of American football from Harrisburg, Pennsylvania